In statistics,  the inverted Dirichlet distribution is a multivariate generalization of the beta prime distribution, and is related to the Dirichlet distribution.  It was first described by Tiao and Cuttman in 1965.

The distribution has a density function given by

The distribution has applications in statistical regression and arises naturally when considering the multivariate Student distribution.  It can be characterized by its mixed moments:

T. Bdiri et al. have developed several models that use the inverted Dirichlet distribution to represent and model non-Gaussian data.  They have introduced finite  and infinite  mixture models of inverted Dirichlet distributions using the Newton–Raphson technique to estimate the parameters and the Dirichlet process to model infinite mixtures. 
T. Bdiri et al. have also used the inverted Dirichlet distribution to propose an approach to generate Support Vector Machine kernels  basing on Bayesian inference  and another approach to establish hierarchical clustering.

References

Multivariate continuous distributions
Conjugate prior distributions
Exponential family distributions
Continuous distributions